Giovanni Velluti may refer to:

Giovanni Velluti (castrato) (1780–1861), Italian castrato
Giovanni Velluti (pianist) (born 1969), Italian pianist
Maria Velluti (1827 – 1891), Portuguese-born Brazilian stage actor and singer
Luigi Velluti (1908 – 1985), Italian sculptor.